PTV News was the flagship evening news program of PTV, which was aired from October 2, 1995, to October 30, 1998, replacing News on 4 and was replaced by National Network News. later from July 11, 2016, to July 9, 2017, replacing News @ 1, News @ 6, NewsLife and The Weekend News and was replaced by Sentro Balita, Ulat Bayan and PTV News Headlines and then from September 18, 2017, replacing the weekday edition of Ulat Bayan and was replaced by the weekday edition of Ulat Bayan. The hour-long newscast is broadcast nationally via PTV-4 and simulcast on government radio network Radyo Pilipinas every Monday to Friday at 6:00 PM. PTV News is also streamed live via Facebook on PTV's official Facebook account.

History

PTV News (then also known as PTV News Nationwide) as the flagship late-night English language newscast was premiered on October 2, 1995, replacing News on 4 and originally anchored by Erik Espina, Chichi Fajardo-Forbes, Chiqui Roa-Puno and Daniel Razon. As part the rebranding of the channel as "PTV Network" during the Estrada Administration, PTV News Nationwide is cancelled (as the first incarnation of PTV News) on October 30, 1998, replaced by National Network News until July 13, 2001.

The network formerly produced an afternoon (1:00pm), primetime (6:00pm), late night (9:15pm) and weekend editions of the newscast from July 11, 2016, to July 9, 2017, as a result of programming changes brought about by the assumption of Duterte Administration, taking over the timeslots of News @ 1, News @ 6, NewsLife and The Weekend News. This marked the second time that PTV's newscasts are in a single brand, the first being Teledyaryo which aired from 2001 to 2012.

It was initially replaced on July 10, 2017, by three newly revamped newscasts: Sentro Balita (afternoon), Ulat Bayan (weekday and weekend evenings) and PTV News Headlines (late night), which was happened few days after the re-branding of the channel on June 28, 2017.

Roughly two months later (September 18), PTV News returned as PTV's premier early-evening newscast while introducing new anchors: Erwin Tulfo (after he resigned from TV5, Radyo5 92.3 News FM and AksyonTV) and Diane Querrer. Ulat Bayan then became PTV's weekend newscast.

As a result of sweeping restructuring changes brought about by a controversy surrounding Erwin Tulfo and his brother Ben with the Department of Tourism and PTV-4, Erwin was removed from the newscast shortly after the scandal broke out and a troika of rotating anchors (Aljo Bendijo, Ralph Obina, and Audrey Gorriceta) filled in for his slot until June 2018,

Alex Santos and Catherine Vital became the new anchors of PTV News on June 4, 2018, formally replacing Tulfo and Querrer, the latter being reassigned back to Daily Info with Audrey Gorriceta. A new headline sequence and title card for the program was introduced on July 16, 2018, barely a few days after PTV's relaunch.

PTV News Mindanao
As part of the expansion of PTV's local programming, a 45-minute regional newscast, PTV News Mindanao was launched on October 16, 2017, and airs on PTV Davao Channel 11 Davao. It is anchored by Jay Lagang and Hannah Salcedo.

Final Anchors
 Aljo Bendijo (main anchor, 2018-2020; Evening Edition, 2016–2017)
 Diane Querrer (main anchor, 2017–2020; Sunday anchor, 2016-2017)
 Alex Santos (main anchor, 2018–2020; Afternoon Edition, 2017)

Final Fill-in Anchors
 Audrey Gorriceta
 Rocky Ignacio
 Juliet Caranguian
 Ceasar Soriano

Final Former anchors
 Erik Espina (1995-1998)
 Chichi Fajardo-Forbes (1995-1998)
 Chiqui Roa-Puno (1995-1998)
 Daniel Razon (1995-1998)
 Jorge Bandola (2016, Saturday and Sunday Edition; now with DZXL RMN Manila 558)
 Kirby Cristobal (2016, Afternoon Edition)
 Audrey Gorriceta (2016-2017, Afternoon Edition)
 Ria Fernandez (2016-2017, Evening and Saturday Edition; now with News5)
 Waywaya Macalma (2016, Sunday Edition)
 Princess Habibah Sarip-Paudac (2016-2017, Afternoon Edition)
 Richmond Cruz (2016-2017, English Edition)
 Catherine Vital (main anchor, 2018–2020, 2016–2017, English Edition; now with PTV News Tonight)
 Charmaine Espina (2016-2017, English Edition)
 Joseph Parafina (2016-2017, Saturday and Sunday Edition)
 Ralph Obina (2016-2017, Saturday Edition, Former, Fill-in Anchors; now with DZBB GMA Super Radyo Manila 594)
 Rocky Ignacio (2016-2017, Saturday Edition)
 Kathy San Gabriel (2016-2017, Evening Edition)
 Erwin Tulfo (main anchor, 2017–2018)

Final Current Segments
 PTV InfoWeather

Final Former Segments
 Balitang Police/Law & Order
 Ulat Malacañang/View From The Palace
 GloBalita/One Global Village
 Balitang Pambansa/The Nation In Review
 BaIitang Panlalawigan/The CountrySide
 Kalakalan/Business On The Move
 PTV Sports
 Ang Linya ng Pagbabago (8888 Hotline Presidential Action Center)
 Digong Hotline 8888
 Police Report
 Inside Showbiz
 PTV Traffic Center
 PAGASA-DOST Weather Update

Final Former segment hosts
 Xiao Chua (Xiao Time segment, 2016–2017)
 Atty. JJ Jimeno-Atienza (Bisig ng Batas segment, 2016–2017)
 Angel Atienza (PTV Sports) (2017)
 Meg Siozon (PTV Sports) (2017)
 Wheng Hidalgo (Ang Linya ng Pagbabago) (2016-2017)
 Salvador Panelo (Ang Linya ng Pagbabago) (2016-2017)
 Ice Martinez-Pajarillo (PTV InfoWeather) (2016-2019)
 Miguel Cruzada (Traffic Watch) (2018-2019)

Final Reporters

National Correspondents and Beats

 Bea Bernardo (AFP/PNP)
 Louisa Erispe (General Assignments)
 Mark Fetalco (City of Manila) 
 Allan Francisco (from DWIZ - City of Manila)
 Deo De Guzman (General Assignments)
 Bernard Jaudian Jr. (Police Beat)
 Patrick De Jesus (General Assignments/NCRPO)
 Mica Ella Joson (Southern Metro/MMDA)
 Ryan Lesigues (from  104.7 Brigada News FM National - General Assignments)
 Mela Lesmoras (Malacañang)
 Daniel Manalastas (from News Light - House of Representatives)
 Kenneth Paciente (Judiciary) 
 Cleizl Pardilla (Quezon City) 
 Sandra Samala (General Assignments)
 Eunice Samonte (PTV Senior Correspondent - Senate)
 Stephanie Sevillano (General Assignments, now with Philippine News Agency) 
 Naomi Tiburcio (General Assignments/Foreign Affairs)
 Karen Villanda (from  CLTV 36 - General Assignments)

Final Regional and International Correspondents

 John Aroa (PTV Cebu)
 Breves Bulsao (PTV Cordillera)
 Jorton Campana (PTV Cordillera)
 Eddie Carta (PTV Cordillera)
 Rachelle Garcia (PTV Cordillera)
 Debbie Gasingan (PTV Cordillera)
 Danielle Grace De Guzman (PTV Cordillera)
 Regine Lanuza (PTV Davao)
 Jay Lagang (PTV Davao)
 Hughie Lenis (PTV Cebu)
 Clodet Loreto (PTV Davao)
 Julius Pacot (PTV Davao)
 Rodirey Salas (PTV Davao)
 Hannah Salcedo (PTV Davao)
 Alah Sungduan (PTV Cordillera)
 Dick Villanueva (PTV France News Stringer)

Final Former Reporters

 Jericho Aguiatan
 Lala Babilonia-Lacsina  (now with GMA News)
 Jorge Bandola (now with DZXL)
 Paolo Barcelon (now with CNN Philippines)
 Arianne Cardiño (now with GMA Corporate Communications)
 Kirby Cristobal (now with Manila Broadcasting Company)
 Joana Cruz (now with Maritime Industry Authority)
 Miguel Cruzada† (2017-2019)
 John Levi Delima
 Jed Del Rosario (now with DWIZ)
 Karol Di
 Anne Dizon 
 Julius Disamburun (now with Erwin Tulfo Media / Radyo Pilipinas 1)
 JM Encinas (now with GMA News / Stand for Truth)
 Rex Espiritu (now with DWIZ)
 Kim Feliciano
 Ria Fernandez (now with News5)
 Dominique Guamos 
 Joy Gumatay (now with DOTr)
 Rocky Ignacio (currently anchor for Ulat Bayan)
 Elena Luna-Panganiban
 Waywaya Macalma
 Jervis Manahan (now with ABS-CBN News)
 Jade Miguel (now with the office of Sen. Joel Villanueva)
 Jarkie Miranda (now with Super Radyo DZBB)
 Marita Moaje (now with Philippine News Agency)
 Amee Olila
 Shari Oliquino 
 Pauline Requesto (now with GMA News)
 Sweeden Velado-Ramirez (now with Light Rail Manila Corporation)

Final Former Regional and International Reporters
 Eddy Arellano (PTV Davao)
 Elric Ayop (PTV Davao)
 Vicky de Guzman (PTV Davao)
 Paola Esguerra (PTV Cordillera)
 Annette Maligad (PTV Davao)
 Rhodamae Hernandez Operations and Production Head (currently anchor from PTVisMin NewsBreak) (PTV Davao)
 Jonathan Llanes (PTV Baguio (now; PTV Cordillera))

See also
 List of programs aired by People's Television Network

References 

Philippine television news shows
People's Television Network original programming
Filipino-language television shows
English-language television shows
1990s Philippine television series
2020s Philippine television series
1995 Philippine television series debuts
1998 Philippine television series endings
2016 Philippine television series debuts
2020 Philippine television series endings
Flagship evening news shows